Piyapan Rattana, is a Thai futsal Defender, and currently a member of  Thailand national futsal team.

References

Piyapan Rattana
1985 births
Living people
Southeast Asian Games medalists in futsal
Piyapan Rattana
Competitors at the 2013 Southeast Asian Games